Tiny may refer to:

Places
 Tiny, Ontario, a township in Canada
 Tiny, Virginia, an unincorporated community in the US
 Tiny Glacier, Wyoming, US

Computing
 Tiny BASIC, a dialect of the computer programming language BASIC
 Tiny Encryption Algorithm, in cryptography, a block cipher notable for its simplicity of description and implementation
 Tiny Computers, a defunct UK computer manufacturer
 TinyMCE, a web-based editor
 TinyMUD, a MUD server
 MU*, a family of MUD servers often called the Tiny family

Automobiles
 Tara Tiny, an Indian electric car
 Tiny (car), a British cyclecar manufactured between 1912 and 1915

People

Nickname
 Nate Archibald (born 1948), American National Basketball Association player
 Tiny Bonham (1913–1949), American Major League Baseball pitcher
 Tiny Bradshaw (1905–1958), American jazz and rhythm and blues bandleader, singer, composer, and musician
 Tiny Broadwick (1893–1978), American pioneering parachutist
 Tiny Cahoon (1900–1973), American National Football League player
 Tameka Cottle, (born 1975), American singer-songwriter and former member of Xscape
 Tiny Croft (1920–1977), American National Football League player
 Paul Engebretsen (1910–1979), American National Football League player
 Tiny Gooch (1903-1986), American all-around college athlete, attorney and politician
 Tiny Grimes (1916–1989), American jazz and R&B guitarist
 Tiny Kahn (1923–1953), American jazz drummer, arranger and composer
 Tiny Kox (born 1953), Dutch politician
 Tiny Leys (1907–1989), New Zealand rugby union player
 Tom Lister Jr. (1958-2020), American actor and wrestler
 Big Tiny Little (born 1930), American pianist
 Tiny Lund (1929–1975), American race car driver
 Tiny Osborne (1893–1969), American Major League Baseball pitcher
 Tiny Parham (1900–1943), Canadian-born American jazz bandleader and pianist
 Kendal Pinder (born 1956), American basketball player
 Tiny Rowland (1917–1998), British businessman and chief executive of the Lonrho conglomerate from 1962 to 1994
 Tiny Ron Taylor (1947–2019), American film actor and former basketball player
 Tiny Sandford (1894–1961), American film actor
 Tiny Thompson (1903–1981), Canadian National Hockey League goaltender
 Tiny Timbrell (1917–1992), Canadian guitarist
 Tiny Wharton (1927–2005), Scottish football referee
 Carl Whiting (born 1981), New Zealand sailor
 Xu Linyin (born 1986), Chinese beach volleyball player

Given name
 Tiny Bounmalay (born 1993), Laotian footballer
 Tiny Hoekstra (born 1996), Dutch footballer
 Tiny Janssen, Dutch retired sidecarcross rider and 1990 world champion
 Tiny Ruys (born 1957), Dutch football coach

Surname
 Tieng Tiny (born 1986), Cambodian footballer

Fictional characters
 Tiny, a character in the 1987 American comedy movie Revenge of the Nerds II: Nerds in Paradise
 Tiny (Rob Zombie), from the Rob Zombie horror films House of 1000 Corpses and The Devil's Rejects
 Tiny (comics), a comic strip character from The Topper
 Tiny Tiger, from the Crash Bandicoot video game series
 Tiny Kong, from the Donkey Kong video game series
 Tiny, from the video game Commandos 2: Men of Courage
 Tiny - Stone Giant, from the video game Warcraft III: Reign of Chaos and derivative games
 Desmond Tiny or Des Tiny, a character in the novel series The Saga of Darren Shan and The Saga of Larten Crepsley

Other uses
 Tiny, of small size
 "Tiny" (Once Upon a Time), an episode of the television series Once Upon a Time
 Tiny and miny

See also
 Tiny Tim (disambiguation)

Lists of people by nickname